The 2013–14 Calcio Catania season was the 82nd season in club history.

Players

Squad information

Competitions

Serie A

League table

Sources

Calcio Catania
Catania S.S.D. seasons